Mount Matutum is an active stratovolcano, is the highest point in the province of  South Cotabato in the Philippines, with an elevation of 7,500 feet (2,286 metres) above sea level, approximately  from Acmonan, Tupi, South Cotabato. Matutum and its foothills are predominantly inhabited by indigenous Blaan families.

Its slopes are forested and host diverse species of plants and animals, including such endangered species as the Philippine eagle and the tarsier.

Location

Physical features

Adjacent volcanic edifices are Landayao, Tampad, and Albulhek, which are all west of the volcano, and Magolo to the north.

Eruptions
Volcanologists suspect that Matutum may have had a phreatic eruption on March 7, 1911.

Matutum is one of the active volcanoes in the Philippines. All are part of the Pacific ring of fire.

See also
 List of active volcanoes in the Philippines
 List of inactive volcanoes in the Philippines
 List of protected areas of the Philippines
 Philippine Institute of Volcanology and Seismology
 List of potentially active volcanoes in the Philippines

References

External links
 Philippine Institute of Volcanology and Seismology (PHIVOLCS) Matutum Volcano Page (archived)
 

Stratovolcanoes of the Philippines
Subduction volcanoes
Volcanoes of Mindanao
Mountains of the Philippines
Landforms of South Cotabato
Active volcanoes of the Philippines
Protected landscapes of the Philippines
Holocene stratovolcanoes